Trechaleoides is a genus of spiders in the family Trechaleidae. It was first described in 2005 by Carico. , it contains 2 species.

References

Trechaleidae
Araneomorphae genera
Spiders of South America